Adrian Miedziński (born 20 August 1985 in Toruń, Poland) is a motorcycle speedway rider from Poland.

Career
Miedziński started riding in Poland during 2002 when he made his debut for KS Toruń, he would go on to ride 16 consecutive seasons of the club and all in the Ekstraliga.

In between he made his British league debut for Eastbourne Eagles in 2004, won the Individual Speedway Junior Polish Championship (in 2005) and won the Team Speedway Junior World Championship (in 2006).

After riding for the Swindon Robins in 2006 he joined the Oxford Cheetahs for the 2007 season but was left without a British club following Oxford's withdrawal from the league. He would not return to Britain again until 2012.

In 2013, he achieved his career best result after winning the Speedway Grand Prix of Poland during the 2013 Speedway Grand Prix series.

He was part of the Smederna team that won the 2019 Elitserien in Sweden.

In 2022, while riding for Bydgoszcz he suffered a serious crash which resulted in him being put into an induced coma due to brain and spinal injuries.

Personal life
His father, Stanisław Miedziński was also a speedway rider.

Major results

World individual Championship
2009 Speedway Grand Prix - =20th (6pts)
2010 Speedway Grand Prix - =20th (6pts)
2013 Speedway Grand Prix - 18th (15pts) including winning the Speedway Grand Prix of Poland
2014 Speedway Grand Prix - 19th (14pts)
2019 Speedway Grand Prix - =21st (4pts)

Speedway Grand Prix

Other
 World Under-21 Championship
 2004 - 7th place (13 points + 4th in Semi-Final)
 2005 - 14th place (2 points)
 2006 - 6th place (8 points)
 Under-21 World Cup
 2006 - World Champion (8 points)
 Individual European Championship
 2006 - 6th place (8 points)
 2008 - 11th place (6 points)
 European Under-19 Championship
 2003 - 15th place (3 points)
 2004 - 13th place (5 points)
 European Pairs Championship
 2007 - 1st place in Semi-Final B (11 points)
 European Club Champions' Cup
 2009 -  Toruń - Runner-up (8 pts) Toruń
 Individual Under 21 Polish Championship
 2003 - 2nd place
 2005 - Polish Champion
 Golden Helmet
 2008 - Bronze medal
 Silver Helmet (U-21)
 2004 - Winner
 Bronze Helmet (U-19)
 2004 - Winner

See also

 Poland national speedway team
 Speedway in Poland

References

1985 births
Living people
Polish speedway riders
Sportspeople from Toruń
Speedway World Cup champions
Team Speedway Junior World Champions
Swindon Robins riders